In computing, MakeModes is an application which is used to generate data which allows  computers to produce display output compatible with various computer monitors. It can generate and modify data which is used by the operating system to produce different graphics display resolutions.

Development 

MakeModes was released in 1994, for use with the RiscPC (initially running ). The documentation was revised for clarity by Frank Watkinson in 2003. The issuing of this revised documentation was supported by RISCOS Ltd.

Features 

MakeModes assists in mode setting, via the editing and creation of monitor definition files (MDFs). It can be used to define screen modes suited to particular monitors.

References 

RISC OS configuration utilities
Proprietary software